El amor tiene cara de mujer is an Argentine telenovela produced by Jacinto Pérez Heredia for Canal 13 and Canal 9 in 1964.

Plot 
The telenovela follows the lives of four women (Bárbara Mujica, Iris Láinez, Delfy de Ortega and Angélica López Gamio) who work in a beauty institute. They are of different ages, social stratums, and lifestyles. Each week, the show is dedicated one woman to allow for the participation of a larger cast. The telenovela aired for seven seasons, until it ended in 1970. To withdraw from the cast Bárbara Mujica, was incorporated in principle to Thelma Biral, and then joined the plot a fifth protagonist, a role that was played in some seasons by Claudia Lapacó and others by Silvina Rada.

Cast 
Delfy de Ortega as Vanessa Lertó
Angélica López Gamio as Matilde
Bárbara Mujica as Marcela
Evangelina Salazar as Betina
Iris Láinez as Laura
Claudia Lapacó
Norma Aleandro
Norma Alexander
Ricardo Aliaga
Arnaldo André
Mariana Karr
Jorge Barreiro
Martha Barrios
Ricardo Bauleo
Miguel Bebán
Zulema Speranza

Versions 
In 1966 performed a version of this soap opera, called in Brazil, O amor tem cara de mulher.
In 1971, Televisa performed this soap opera under the same name, Starring by Silvia Derbez, Irma Lozano, Irán Eory and Lucy Gallardo.
In 1973, it took to film in Mexico, directed by Tito Davidson.
In 1976, an Argentine version was made with Virginia Lago, Cristina Tejedor, Beatriz Día Quiroga, Dora Prince and Christian Bach.
In 1984, was repeated again in Mexico with the title of Principessa.
In 1994, Televisa performed this soap opera under the same name, Starring by Thelma Biral, Marita Ballesteros, Laura Novoa, Marcelo Alfaro and Laura Flores.
In 2007, a renewed version titled was made  Palabra de mujer.

References

External links 
 

1964 Argentine television series debuts
1970 Argentine television series endings
Argentine telenovelas
Spanish-language telenovelas
1964 telenovelas
1965 telenovelas
1966 telenovelas
1967 telenovelas
1968 telenovelas
1969 telenovelas
1970 telenovelas
El Trece telenovelas